Narciso C. Bernardo (July 27, 1937 – December 23, 2008), also known as Ciso Bernardo, was a Filipino basketball player, coach and politician. Bernardo was born in Manila, Philippines. He played for Ysmael Steel, Crispa and Mariwasa in the Manila Industrial and Commercial Athletic Association (MICAA). Bernardo also appeared at the Olympic Games as a member of the country's national basketball team. He coached the Crispa 400s in the MICAA and later the Crispa Redmanizers in the Philippine Basketball Association, where he guided the team to the 1984 PBA First All-Filipino Conference championship, which was to be Crispa's final PBA championship title.

He also served as Councilor in Mandaluyong City, as part of its District 2 Councilors in the late 90s to early 2000s.

References

External links
 

1937 births
2008 deaths
Asian Games medalists in basketball
Basketball players at the 1960 Summer Olympics
Basketball players at the 1962 Asian Games
Basketball players at the 1972 Summer Olympics
Filipino men's basketball coaches
Olympic basketball players of the Philippines
Crispa Redmanizers coaches
Philippines men's national basketball team players
Filipino men's basketball players
Crispa Redmanizers players
NU Bulldogs basketball players
Basketball players from Manila
Asian Games gold medalists for the Philippines
Medalists at the 1962 Asian Games
U/Tex Wranglers coaches